Jon Murray is the current head coach of the Texas Tech Red Raiders and Lady Raiders cross country teams. He was named Big 12 Women's Cross Country Coach of the Year in 2008, 2009, and 2010.

References

External links
Profile at Texas Tech Athletics
Texas Tech Cross Country

Year of birth missing (living people)
Living people
Texas Tech University faculty
Harding University alumni